The Fly-Fisher's Entomology, Illustrated by Coloured Representations of the Natural and Artificial Insect and Accompanied by a Few Observations and Instructions Relative to Trout-and-Grayling Fishing, first published in 1836 by Alfred Ronalds (1802–1860), was the first comprehensive work related to the entomology associated with fly fishing.  Although the work was Ronalds' only book, it was published in 11 editions between 1836 and 1913 and has been extensively reprinted in the last 100 years.

Synopsis

The Fly-fisher's Entomology is the archetype fly-fishing how-to book. Most fly-fishing historians credit Ronalds with setting a literature standard in 1836 that is still followed today.  Describing methods, techniques and, most importantly, artificial flies, in a meaningful way for the angler and illustrating them in colour is a method of presentation that can be seen in most fly-fishing literature today. As the name implies, this book is mostly about the aquatic insects—mayflies, caddisflies and stoneflies—that trout and grayling feed on and their counterpart artificial imitations.  Less than half the book (chapters I–III) is devoted to observations of trout, their behaviour, and the methods and techniques used to catch them. Most of this information, although enhanced by Ronalds' experiences and observations, was merely an enhancement of Charles Bowlker's Art of Angling (first published in 1774 but still in print in 1836).

Ronalds introduced several new ideas, however, in Chapter I.  His experiments and observations led him to describe and illustrate the trout's Window of vision, a concept an understanding of which is still essential today. Vincent Marinaro, in his classic work In the Ring of the Rise (1976), credits Ronalds with discovering and documenting this window and includes a reproduction of plate II–Optical diagrams in his book.  Ronalds’ physicist brother Sir Francis Ronalds quantified the phenomenon for Alfred using his knowledge of optics. In the sub-chapter "Haunts", through discussion and illustration (plate I), Alfred Ronalds introduces the idea known today as reading the water to help the angler identify the most likely locations in the stream to find trout.
 
The real meat of Ronalds' book was Chapter IV: Of a Selection of Insects, and Their Imitations, Used in Fly Fishing.  Here, for the first time, the author discussed specific artificial fly imitations by name, associated with the corresponding natural insect. Organized by their month of appearance, Ronalds was the first author to begin the standardization of angler names for artificial flies.  Prior to The Fly-fisher's Entomology, anglers had been given suggestions for artificial flies to be used on a particular river or at a particular time of the year, but those suggestions were never matched to specific natural insects the angler might encounter on the water.  The following is a typical discussion:

Author
Alfred Ronalds was born in Highbury, London in 1802, the 11th of 12 children.  His father was a successful merchant and his eldest brother, Sir Francis Ronalds, became famous for pioneering the electric telegraph. In 1817 at the age of 15, Ronalds took an apprenticeship as an engraver, lithographer and copper-plate printer. In 1830 he moved to Tixall, Staffordshire. He married his first wife, Margaret Bond, a local girl, in 1831.

In Staffordshire, Ronalds took up the sport of fly fishing, learning the craft on the rivers Trent, Blythe and Dove. On the River Blythe, near what is today Creswell Green, Ronalds constructed a bankside fishing hut designed primarily as an observatory of trout behaviour in the river. From this hut, and elsewhere on his home rivers, Ronalds conducted experiments and formulated the ideas that eventually were published in The Fly-fisher's Entomology. He combined his knowledge of fly fishing with his skill as an engraver and printer, to lavish his work with 20 colour plates.

In 1844, Ronalds moved his family to Dolgelly North Wales and in 1846 he moved to Brecon in South Wales, then to Cwmback, Llanalwedd, to become a full-time tackle maker and fly tier. In 1847, his first wife Margaret died during childbirth. In 1848 with six of his children, Ronalds moved to Melbourne, Australia and set up an engraving business.  The gold rushes of the 1850 eventually found Ronalds settled in Ballarat, where he died suddenly of a stroke in 1860. He never returned to England.

Contents

 Chapter 1 – Observations On The Trout And Grayling.
 Of The Trout. Measurement, Weight, Fins, Colour, Condition, Haunts, &c. Description of a Fishing-hut or Observatory, The Trout's sense of Hearing, Sight, Taste and Smell. Manner of feeding, &c. Form, Weight, Fins, &c. of the Grayling, Colour, Condition, Haunts, Food
 Chapter II – Of Tackle
 Rod, Line, Reel. Foot Line, Hook, Dubbing Bag, General Directions for making a Fly and a Palmer. Dyes for Feathers. Fly Books and Boxes, Crele [sic], Landing Net
 Chapter III – Manner of Fishing for Trout and Grayling
 Preparation of the Rod and Line. Art of Throwing, Choice of Weather. State of the Water. Choice of a Fly. Appearance of Life to be given to the Fly. Buzz flies sometimes preferred. Rising short, &c. Sudden cessation of Rises, &c. Places to be whipped, &c Throwing to a Trout just risen. Striking. Killing, Landing. Differences between Trout and Grayling fishing. Manner of presenting the Fly. Landing, &c
 Chapter IV – Of a Selection of Insects, and Their Imitations, Used In Fly Fishing.
 Flies, &c. used in March, Flies, &c. for April, For May, For June, For July, For August, For September, Palmers for the Season
 List of Plates
 Trout and Grayling - - Frontispiece.
 I. Haunts of the Trout, &c.
 II. Optical Diagrams
 III. Fly-making Figures
 IV. Red Fly.—Cock Wing.— Red Spinner
 V. Water Cricket.—Great Dark Drone.—Cow Dung Fly
 VI. Peacock Fly.—March Brown.—Great Red Spinner
 VII. Golden Dun Midge.- Sand Fly.—Stone Fly
 VIII. Gravel Bed.—Grannom.—Yellow Dun
 IX. Iron Blue Dun.—Jenny Spinner.—Hawthorn Fly
 X. Little Yellow May Dun.—Black Gnat.—Downhill Fly
 XI. Turkey Brown. — Little Dark Spinner. — Yellow Sally
 XII. Sky Blue.—Fern Fly.—Aldar Fly
 XIII. Green Drake.— Grey Drake
 XIV. Marlow Buzz.—Dark Mackerel
 XV. Pale Evening Dun. — July Dun. — Gold Eyed Gauze Wing
 XVI. WrenTail.—Red Ant. —Silver horns
 XVII. August Dun.—Orange Fly.—Cinnamon Fly
 XVIII. Blue Bottle.— Whirling Blue Dun.— Little Pale Blue Dun.—Willow Fly
 XIX. Red Palmer.—Brown Palmer.—Black Palmer

Contents, from 1st Edition, 1836

Reviews
 John Waller Hills in A History of Fly Fishing for Trout (1921) gave Ronalds' only work high praise:

 Ernest Schwiebert, in his 1973 seminal work Nymphs, explains Ronalds thus:

 Arnold Gingrich, in his The Fishing in Print (1974), credits Ronalds:

 Andrew Herd, noted fly-fishing historian, characterized The Fly-fisher's Entomology thus:

 William C. Black, in Gentlemen Preferred Dry Flies (2010) noted:

Editions
From: 
 First Edition, London, Longmans, 1836. 115 pages
 Second Edition, With twenty copper plates. London, Longmans, 1839 115 pages
 Third edition, London, Longmans, 1844. 115 pages
 Fourth edition, London, Longmans, 1849. 115 pages
 Fifth edition, revised, with additions by Piscator. London, Longmans, 1856. 132 pages
 Sixth edition. London, Longmans. 1862. 132 pages
 Seventh edition. London, Longmans. 1868. 132 pages
 Eighth edition. London, Longmans, 1877. 132 pages
From Antiquarian Book Exchange
 Ninth edition. London, Longmans, 1883. 132 pages
 Tenth edition. London, Longmans, 1901. 132 pages, edited by J. C. Carter
 1913 limited edition (250), Liverpool, Henry Young and Sons. 1913
 1921 edition, London, Herbert Jenkins. 152 pages, edited by H.T.Sheringham
 1993 Fly-fisher's Classic Library, limited reprint of 5th edition (1000), 1993
 1997 reprint, Easton Press, 1997
 1836 edition reprint, Pranava Books, 2007 print on demand
 Pre-1923 reproduction, Bibliolife, 2009,

Further reading

See also
 Bibliography of fly fishing

Notes

1836 non-fiction books
Angling literature
Fly fishing literature
British books
Recreational fishing in the United Kingdom